Crazy Life may refer to:

 Crazy Life (Gino Vannelli album), 1973
 Crazy Life (Lil Rob album), 1997
 "Crazy Life", a single by Toad the Wet Sprocket from Coil, 1997
 "Crazy Life", a song by Tim Rushlow as well as the reissue title of Tim Rushlow (album), 2001

See also
 This Crazy Life, an album by Joanna Pacitti, 2006
"The Crazy Life", a song by Girls Aloud from their 2006 single "Something Kinda Ooooh"